Dave Snell is the radio play-by-play voice of Bradley Braves men's basketball in Peoria, Illinois.  He has been the voice of Bradley basketball since 1979, partnering with former Bradley player and head coach Joe Stowell since 1985 on WMBD (AM).  During the 2008–2009 season Snell broadcast his 900th Bradley basketball game.  He was previously sports director for WMBD-TV; 

Snell attended Pekin Community High School in nearby Pekin, Illinois in the late 1960s, and graduated from Bradley University in 1976.

References

Living people
Year of birth missing (living people)
American radio personalities
American sports announcers
American television personalities
Bradley Braves men's basketball
Bradley University alumni
People from Pekin, Illinois
People from Peoria, Illinois